Willy Schneider (5 September 1905, in Cologne – 12 January 1989, in Cologne) was a German schlager singer.

Songs 

1937: "Auf der Heide blüh'n die letzten Rosen"
1937: "Das kannst Du nicht ahnen"
1937: "Kornblumenblau"
1938: "Grün ist die Heide"
1938: "Blaue Donau, grüner Rhein" (on occasion of the Anschluss)
1939: "Gute Nacht, Mutter"
1940: "Herzliebchen mein unter'm Rebendach"
1942: "Heimat, deine Sterne"
1948: "Heimweh nach Virginia"
1949: "Heimweh nach Köln"
1949: "O Mosella"
1950: "Wenn das Wasser im Rhein gold'ner Wein wär"
1950: "Kleine Kellnerin aus Heidelberg"
1952: "Schütt' die Sorgen in ein Gläschen Wein"
1953: "Man müsste nochmal zwanzig sein"
1956: ""
1968: "Behüt' Dich Gott, es wär' so schön gewesen"
1973: "Alle Tage ist kein Sonntag"

Awards 
 Willi-Ostermann-Medaille
 1973: Order of Merit of the Federal Republic of Germany, 1st class
 1975: 
 1983: Hermann-Löns-Medaille

External links 

 
 
 100 years Willy Schneider 
 

20th-century German male singers
German folk singers
Schlager musicians
Officers Crosses of the Order of Merit of the Federal Republic of Germany
Musicians from Cologne
1905 births
1989 deaths